The Shire of Rosalie was a local government area in the Darling Downs region of Queensland, Australia, immediately northwest of the regional city of Toowoomba. In 2008, it amalgamated with several other councils in the Toowoomba area to form the Toowoomba Region.

Geography
The shire offices were located in Goombungee, with the shire boundary stretching in a triangular pattern north to Yarraman, southwest to Bowenville and southeast to Gowrie Junction.

Commerce and industry 
Industry in Rosalie Shire centred on the towns of Yarraman and Goombungee. Goombungee contains M & S Steel Buildings, and Leicht's Country Industries Australia. Other enterprises within the Shire included cluster industries, a private dairy factory, orchards, boutique cheese-makers, vineyards and wineries, accommodation operators, tour operators, aged care facility provision, an immigration hostel, a correctional facility and host-farming (farm-stay holidays).

Goombungee was in many ways the centre of Rosalie Shire. A town with approximately 750 persons, the shire's head office was in Goombungee, along with the main branch of the library. Recently moving to new premises nearby, the library made way for a dedicated art gallery within the Shire Office's building.

History 
Rosalie Shire was one of the earliest areas settled in the Darling Downs region of South East Queensland. The first settlers in the area were Henry Hughes and Henry Isaac, who squatted on land surrounding Gowrie Creek and took up a  frontage along the creek. They were soon followed by others who took up sheep runs in the Darling Downs portion of the Shire. Soon the whole area was occupied by only three vast stations: Gowrie-Goombungee, Westbrook and Rosalie Plains. In the 1860s, railways — particularly the main Western line near the Shire's southern boundary — became a lifeline and permitted agricultural development and expansion to occur.

Governance 

The first local government was the Rosalie Division incorporated on 11 November 1879 under the Divisional Boards Act 1879 with a population of 1409.

With the passage of the Local Authorities Act 1902, Rosalie Division became Shire of Rosalie on 31 March 1903. Initially, the boundaries of the Shire were far from clear, with many adjustments being made with adjoining Shires up until 1914.

Declining terms of trade for dairy farmers in the post-World War II period, along with mechanisation in agriculture, led to a decline in the Shire's population, reaching its lowest level since early settlement in the mid-1970s. However, wine-making, tourism and the growth of Toowoomba as an urban centre into the Shire's southern areas provided something of a revival.

The council consisted of an elected mayor and eight councillors, and was not subdivided into wards.

On 15 March 2008, under the Local Government (Reform Implementation) Act 2007 passed by the Parliament of Queensland on 10 August 2007, the Shire of Rosalie merged with the City of Toowoomba and the Shires of Cambooya, Clifton, Crows Nest, Jondaryan, Millmerran and Pittsworth to form the Toowoomba Region.

Towns and localities
The Shire of Rosalie includes the following settlements:

 Goombungee
 Acland
 Bowenville1
 Evergreen
 Glencoe
 Gowrie Junction1, 2
 Kingsthorpe1
 Meringandan West
 Upper Yarraman
 Yarraman

1 - split with the former Shire of Jondaryan
2 - split with the former City of Toowoomba

Population

Chairmen and mayors
 1880–1894: John Frederick McDougall, Member of the Queensland Legislative Council 1860—1895
 1894–1895: R. Sharpe
 1895–1896: Henry Venn King
 1896–1897: Daniel McMahon
 1897–1898: John Mathieson
 1898–1899: H.P. Dunn
 1899–1900: F. Wockner
 1900–1901: R. Sharpe
 1901–1902: Henry Venn King
 1902–1903: Daniel McMahon
 1903–1904: Henry Venn King
 1904–1905: John Bews
 1905–1906: J.S. Lee
 1906–1907: John Bews
 1907–1910: Alfred James Luke, Member of the Queensland Legislative Assembly for the electoral district of Aubigny 1912–1915 
 1910–1911: Henry Venn King
 1911–1929: Arthur Edward Moore, Member of the Queensland Legislative Assembly for the electoral district of Aubigny 1912–1941 and Premier of Queensland 1929–1932
 1929–1936: Morris Harland
 1936–1939: Henry John Winten
 1939–1946: J.J. Gleeson
 1946–1962: S.A. Plant
 1962–1973: W.F. Kajewski
 1973–1997: Alick Williams
 1997–2008: Noel Strohfeld

References

External links
 
 

 
Former local government areas of Queensland
Darling Downs
Toowoomba
1879 establishments in Australia
2008 disestablishments in Australia
Populated places disestablished in 2008